Katrina Mae De Lara Tolentino (born January 27, 1995) is a Filipino-Canadian volleyball player who currently plays for the Choco Mucho Flying Titans in the Premier Volleyball League.

Personal life 
Tolentino came from a Filipino-Canadian sports family in British Columbia. She studied in McMath Secondary School in Richmond, British Columbia in Canada before moving to the Philippines and study at Ateneo de Manila University. Her brother, Vince, played for the Rain or Shine Elasto Painters basketball team. Before moving to the Philippines, Kat  already suffered two anterior cruciate ligament injury (ACL) on her left knee and just as she was set to debut for Ateneo Lady Eagles volleyball team in 2015, she tore her right one during a game in the Shakey’s V-League and had to undergo Anterior cruciate ligament reconstruction and months of rehab all over again.

Clubs 
  Ateneo-Motolite (2018)
  Choco Mucho Flying Titans (2019–present)

Awards

Individual 
 2018 Premier Volleyball League Open Conference "Best Opposite Spiker"
 2019 UAAP Season 81 "Best Opposite Spiker"
 2021 Premier Volleyball League Open Conference "Best Opposite Spiker"

Collegiate 
2015 SVL 12th Season Collegiate Conference -  Silver medal, with Ateneo De Manila University Lady Eagles
2016 UAAP Season 78 -  Silver medal, with Ateneo Lady Eagles
 2016 ASEAN University Games -  Bronze medal, with Ateneo De Manila University Lady Eagles
 2016 SVL 13th Season Collegiate Conference –  Silver medal, with Ateneo De Manila University Lady Eagles
2017 UAAP Season 79 -  Silver medal, with Ateneo Lady Eagles
2018 UAAP Season 80 -  Bronze medal, with Ateneo Lady Eagles
2018 Premier Volleyball League Open Conference -  Silver medal, with Ateneo Motolite Lady Eagles
2019 UAAP Season 81 -  Champion, with Ateneo Lady Eagles
 2019 UAAP Season 81 Indoor Volleyball –  Champion with Ateneo de Manila Lady Eagles

Club 
 2019 PVL Open Conference Season 2 –  Silver with Ateneo-Motolite

References 

1995 births
Living people
Opposite hitters
University Athletic Association of the Philippines volleyball players
Ateneo de Manila University alumni
Filipino women's volleyball players
Competitors at the 2021 Southeast Asian Games
Southeast Asian Games competitors for the Philippines
Canadian sportspeople of Filipino descent